Hislop is an English, Scottish and Irish name in origin. The name belongs to the class of topographic surnames, which were given to people who resided near physical features such as hills, streams, churches or types of trees. It derives from Old English haesel / Old Norse hesli, which both mean hazel, plus Old English hop which refers to a valley or hollow between two hills.

The earliest records are found in Yorkshire.

The First Fleet to Australia saw James John Henry Hislop transported to Western Australia as a convict; he became a teacher upon his release. Elizabeth Hislop arrived in Adelaide aboard the ship  in 1839.

Notable people sharing the surname Hislop
 Alexander Hislop, Scottish minister of religion
 Charles Hislop, Cayman Islands entrepreneur
 David Hislop, Australian cross-country skier
 George Hislop, Canadian gay activist
 Ian Hislop, editor of British satirical magazine Private Eye
 John Hislop, convict deported to Australia
 John Hislop (teacher), (1821–1904), New Zealand educationalist and father of Thomas William Hislop
 Joseph Hislop, Scottish singer
 Percy Hislop, Scottish footballer
 Peter Hislop, American mathematician
 Shaka Hislop, football goalkeeper born in England to parents from Trinidad and Tobago
 Steve Hislop, Scottish motorcycle racer
 Thomas William Hislop (1850–1925), Mayor of Wellington, New Zealand  
 Thomas Hislop (mayor) (1888–1965), son of above, also Mayor of Wellington   
 Victoria Hislop, British author

See also
 Hyslop
 Heslop

References